Mr Majeika is the title of a series of children's books, written by Humphrey Carpenter and published between 1984 and 2006. It was adapted into a children's television series of the same title and produced for the ITV network by TVS. The show aired between 1988 and 1990 and starred Stanley Baxter as Mr Majeika. The stories have also been broadcast on radio.

The first volume, Mr Majeika, was published in 1984 and was followed by Mr Majeika and the Music Teacher, Mr Majeika and the Haunted Hotel and The TV Adventures of Mr Majeika.

Plot 
The focus of these stories is Mr Majeika, a teacher at St Barty's Primary School, a typical English primary school. However he is no ordinary man, as is apparent when he flies into Class Three's boring lesson on a magic carpet, which he then turns into a bicycle, confounding the headmaster: Mr Majeika is a wizard!

He thereafter astounds them with magical trickery which bring lessons to life, whether it is providing chips during dinner for all the children, or turning the nasty Hamish Bigmore into a frog for his insolence. Whatever the consequences, Class Three are sure that with Mr Majeika around, they will not be bored again. A recurring character is Wilhelmina Worlock, a witch who first appeared as a music teacher and has turned up regularly since in various disguises.

In the television series, Mr Majeika is an irrepressible wizard, sent to "Britland" from the planet Walpurgis because he failed his O-level sorcery exam for the seventeenth time. He drops into the sleepy village of Much Barty, finding a post at St Barty's School as Class Three's new form-teacher, where he quickly befriends two of the children, Melanie Brace-Girdle and Thomas Grey. Both of these characters are also in the books, but Melanie is a much less important and very different type of character in the books, and is replaced by another character as female lead, Jody. Also in the books, Thomas has a twin brother called Pete.

Majeika enters into his magic with reluctance, however, because he is trying hard to behave himself on Earth, and because the Worshipful Wizard of Walpurgis is keeping an eye on him from above. All the same, trickery becomes more and more necessary, leading Majeika, Melanie and Thomas into some remarkable adventures. Their fun is despised, but usually prompted, by the horribly spoilt Hamish, a pupil so ghastly that his mere presence caused the resignation of the previous class teacher and frightened off the 79 applicants for the post. But one waggle of Mr Majeika's oddly tufted grey hair is all that it takes for Bigmore to be put firmly in his place.

Books in the series

TV show

The series was written by Jenny McDade. Carpenter wrote the fourth book based on McDade's scripts, The Television Adventures of Mr Majeika. Three series of the programme were made, comprising twenty episodes in total. The location for St. Barty's Primary School was Matfield House in Tonbridge, Kent.

Cast
Stanley Baxter as Mr Majeika
Roland MacLeod as Dudley Potter
Fidelis Morgan as Bunty Brace-Girdle
Eve Ferret as Pam Bigmore
Claire Sawyer as Melanie Brace-Girdle
Miriam Margolyes as Wilhermina Warlock
Simeon Pearl as Hamish Bigmore
Richard Murdoch as	 Worshipful Wizard
Andrew Read as Thomas Grey
Adele Silva as Fenella Fudd
Christopher Mitchell as Ron Bigmore
Sanjiv Madan as Prince
Pat Coombs as Miss Flavia Jelley
Vernon Dobtcheff as Wizard Marks
Robin Driscoll as Sgt. Sevenoaks

Availability
There has been no commercial release of Mr Majeika on DVD in the UK. This is possibly due to ongoing rights issues after the production company, TVS, dropped out of the ITV network in 1992 and subsequently went through a number of take-overs. This problem affects the majority of the TVS programme archive as much of the original production paperwork and sales documentation has been lost during the intervening years. According to Kaleidoscope's TV Brain website, nine episodes of the series no longer exist in broadcast quality, although all but one of these is available on YouTube.

References

External links

1984 children's books
British children's novels
British fantasy novel series
British novels adapted into television shows
Novels set in England
Novels set in elementary and primary schools
Series of children's books
Witchcraft in written fiction